Peter Shaw may refer to:
 Peter Shaw (physician) (1694–1763), English physician and medical author
 Peter Shaw (producer, born 1918) (1918–2003), British actor and film producer, husband of actress Angela Lansbury
 Peter Shaw (producer, born 1942) (born 1942), British film producer
 Peter Shaw (footballer) (born 1956), English footballer active during the 1980s
 Peter Shaw (American actor) (born 1966), American film and television actor
 Peter Stapleton Shaw (1888–1953), British Member of Parliament for Liverpool Wavertree, 1935–1945
 Peter Shaw (bowls) (born 1954), New Zealand lawn bowler

See also
 Pete Shaw (disambiguation)